Sexy 8 Beat (stylized as ) is the eighth studio album by the J-pop girl group Morning Musume.

Overview
It is the first album to feature 8th generation member Aika Mitsui and the last full-length studio release to feature 4th generation member Hitomi Yoshizawa as the group's leader and 6th generation member Miki Fujimoto as both the group's subleader. The album was released on March 21, 2007.

The album features the band's previous four singles "Aruiteru" (which also appeared on the EP 7.5 Fuyu Fuyu Morning Musume Mini! in December 2006), "Egao Yes Nude", "Sexy Boy: Soyokaze ni Yorisotte" and "Ambitious! Yashinteki de Ii Jan". Also, as with Rainbow 7 and 7.5 Fuyu Fuyu..., tracks by four different sub-factions of the group are featured, including a solo track by Yoshizawa and the third pairing of Sayumi Michishige and Koharu Kusumi as their alter-egos "Shige-pinku" and "Koha-pinku" (first established on Rainbow 7's "Rainbow Pink").

The limited edition of the album includes a DVD; a bonus CD was also rumored for this edition but never materialized. The first pressing of the regular edition came with two photo cards.

Track listing

Bonus DVD (Limited edition only) 
Tracks 2 and 3 on the DVD were recorded live at Hello! Project's 2007 Winter Wonderful Hearts Otome Gokoro concert.

Personnel

Vocals 
 Hitomi Yoshizawa – except tracks 5, 9 and 10
 Ai Takahashi – except tracks 5 and 10
 Risa Niigaki – except tracks 5 and 10
 Miki Fujimoto – except tracks 5 and 10
 Eri Kamei – except tracks 9 and 10
 Sayumi Michishige – except tracks 5 and 9
 Reina Tanaka – except tracks 5 and 10
 Koharu Kusumi – except tracks 5 and 9
 Aika Mitsui – except tracks 2, 6, 7, 8 and 10
 Asami Konno – tracks 6 and 7, uncredited
 Makoto Ogawa – tracks 6 and 7, uncredited
 Tsunku – chorus (tracks 2, 4, 6, 9, 10, and 11)
 Hiroaki Takeuchi – chorus (tracks 1, 2, 3, 4, 6, 7, 10, and 11)
 Chino – chorals (tracks 5 and 9)

Arrangers 
 Hideyuki "Daichi" Suzuki – tracks 1 and 2; programming and guitar
 Shōichirō Hirata – track 3; programming
 Hiroshi Matsui – track 4 and 11; programming and keyboards
 Yuichi Takahashi – tracks 5 and 6; programming and guitar
 Kōichi Yuasa – track 7; programming
 Akira – track 8; programming
 Takashi Morio – track 9; programming
 Shunsuke Suzuki – track 10; programming and guitar

Instruments 
 Yoshinari Takejō – tenor saxophone (track 2)
 Kōji – guitar (tracks 7 and 9)
 Akio Suzuki – saxophone (track 11)
 Kōichi Korenaga – guitar (tracks 4 and 11)

Oricon ranks and sales

References

External links 
Sexy 8 Beat entry at Up-Front Works official website

2007 albums
Morning Musume albums
Zetima albums